The 2001/02 FIS Nordic Combined World Cup was the 19th world cup season, a combination of ski jumping and cross-country skiing organized by FIS. It started on 23 Nov 2001 in Kuopio, Finland and ended on 16 March 2002 in Oslo, Norway.

Calendar

Men

Team

Standings

Overall 

Standings after 19 events.

Sprint 

Standings after 11 events.

Warsteiner Grand Prix 

Standings after 3 events.

Nations Cup 

Standings after 20 events.

References

External links
FIS Nordic Combined World Cup 2001/02 

2001 in Nordic combined
2002 in Nordic combined
FIS Nordic Combined World Cup